Harry Hopp (December 18, 1918December 22, 1964) was a professional American football fullback who played in the National Football League (NFL) and the All-America Football Conference (AAFC). He played for the NFL's Detroit Lions (1941–1943) and the AAFC's Buffalo Bisons (1946), Miami Seahawks (1946), and Los Angeles Dons (1947).

1918 births
1964 deaths
People from Hastings, Nebraska
Players of American football from Nebraska
American football fullbacks
Nebraska Cornhuskers football players
Detroit Lions players
Buffalo Bisons (AAFC) players
Miami Seahawks players
Los Angeles Dons players
Hastings Senior High School (Nebraska) alumni